Kim Young-gun (born 24 November 1984) is a South Korean para table tennis player. He has participated in four Summer Paralympic Games and has won twelve titles in Asian Para Table Tennis Championships. He is coached by Kim Byoung-young.

His impairment came as a result of developing acute transverse myelitis in 1997.

References

Living people
Paralympic medalists in table tennis
Table tennis players at the 2004 Summer Paralympics
Table tennis players at the 2008 Summer Paralympics
Table tennis players at the 2012 Summer Paralympics
Table tennis players at the 2016 Summer Paralympics
Medalists at the 2004 Summer Paralympics
Medalists at the 2012 Summer Paralympics
Medalists at the 2016 Summer Paralympics
1984 births
Paralympic silver medalists for South Korea
Paralympic gold medalists for South Korea
Sportspeople from South Jeolla Province
Paralympic table tennis players of South Korea
South Korean male table tennis players
Table tennis players at the 2020 Summer Paralympics
FESPIC Games competitors